= A Political Theory of Rights =

1994 nonfiction book by Attracta Ingram

- Author: Attracta Ingram
- Publisher: Clarendon Press
- Publication date: 17 November 1994
- ISBN: 978-0-198-27963-1

A Political Theory of Rights is a political science book by Attracta Ingram. It was published in 1994 by Clarendon Press, an imprint of Oxford University Press.
